Commatarcha is a genus of moths in the Carposinidae family.

Species
Commatarcha acidodes Diakonoff, 1989
Commatarcha characterias (Meyrick, 1932) (originally in Bondia)
?Commatarcha autocharacta (Meyrick, 1932) (originally in Bondia)
Commatarcha chrysanches (Meyrick, 1938) (originally in Bondia)
Commatarcha citrogramma (Meyrick, 1938) (originally in Delarchis)
Commatarcha convoluta  Li, 2018
Commatarcha hamata  Li, 2018
Commatarcha oresbia Diakonoff, 1989
Commatarcha palaeosema Meyrick, 1935
Commatarcha quaestrix (Meyrick, 1935) (originally in Bondia)
Commatarcha rotundivalva  Li, 2018
Commatarcha setiferaedeaga  Li, 2018
Commatarcha vaga Diakonoff, 1989

References

Natural History Museum Lepidoptera generic names catalog

Carposinidae